Christoph Schneider (born 11 May 1966) is a German musician, best known as the drummer of the Neue Deutsche Härte band Rammstein.

Early life
Christoph Schneider was born in Pankow, East Berlin, East Germany. He has one sister, who is two years younger than him.

Schneider left the extended secondary school at age 16 and went on to work as a telecommunications assistant. In 1984, he served his national service with the East German Army; he is the only member of Rammstein to have served in the military.

Career
Schneider's parents wanted him to learn an instrument, so they sent him to a special music school connected to a Pioneers' orchestra, where he was offered the choice between trumpet, clarinet, and trombone, out of which he chose the trumpet first because it was the easiest to play. He describes himself as very talented at playing the trumpet, and after a year he got into the orchestra and played concerts. It was here he became interested in playing the drums: he was impressed by the equipment and kept looking over his shoulder at the drumset while playing. He told his parents he wanted to learn to play the drums, but they weren't supportive because "they were both from the classical world". He would go home and practice with sticks and built his own drum set with tin cans and buckets. He bought his first drumkit at age 14, after which his parents had to accept it and let him rehearse and take lessons.

In 1985, Schneider quit his telecommunication job to pursue his musical ambitions by studying music at university, but failed to get into university twice, being rejected because he possessed no other musical skills such as playing the piano. He continued to learn to play himself. Schneider tried consistently from 1985 until 1990 to get into bands as a drummer, finally being successful with Die Firma.

In 1994, he joined Richard Kruspe and Oliver Riedel in forming an early version of Rammstein. After Till Lindemann joined the band, they entered the Berlin Senate Metrobeat contest, winning the chance to record a professional demo with four tracks. A previous band of Schneider's, Feeling B, provided two other members of Rammstein, Paul Landers and keyboardist Christian Lorenz.

Personal life 

The nickname "Doom" comes from the video game of the same name. Schneider needed a name for the German copyright agency, but found there were too many Christoph Schneiders already. Paul Landers suggested the name "Doom" because they liked the game. Schneider has said that had he known that name would be on every record he played on, he would have chosen a different one.

He has been married twice, previously to Regina Gizatulina. The two got married in 2005; however, they have been divorced since 2009. He married his second wife, Ulrike Schmid, in 2014. Schneider and Schmid have three children.

His favorite rock bands are Deep Purple, Led Zeppelin, Motörhead, Black Sabbath, and AC/DC. He cites Ian Paice, Phil Rudd, Vinnie Paul, and Chad Smith as his main drumming influences.

Equipment

Schneider uses and endorses Sabian cymbals, DW drum kits, pedals and hardware Vic Firth drumsticks and Remo Drumheads. He previously used and endorsed Sonor Drums,  Tama Drums and Meinl cymbals.

Current DW touring kit

Drums – DW Collector's Series Jazz, Maple/Gum shells, Matte Black Finish
24x18 Bass Drum (x2)
13x10 Tom
16x16 Floor Tom
18x16 Floor Tom
21x16 Gong Drum
12x5 Collector's Maple Snare Drum
14x6 Collector's Edge Snare Drum
Cymbals – Sabian
15" HHX Groove Hats (main)
15" Artisan Hats (auxiliary)
22" AAX Heavy Ride
20" AAX Medium Crash
20" AAX X-Plosion Crash
20" HHX X-Plosion Crash
19" AAX X-Plosion Fast Crash
21" AA Holy China
12" AAX Aero Splash over 12" AA Mini Holy China stack
Hardware – DW
Other
Vic Firth SCS Christoph Schneider Signature Drumsticks
Remo Drumheads
Snare: Controlled sound X / Ambassador Snare Side,
Toms:Clear Pinstripe / Clear Diplomat,
Bass: Clear Powerstroke P3 / Powerstroke P3 Ebony

References

External links

Rammstein.com
Rammstein-Interviews.com

Living people
Feeling B members
German heavy metal drummers
Male drummers
German male musicians
Musicians from Berlin
Rammstein members
1966 births
People from Pankow
Industrial metal musicians